The Selby rail crash (also known as the Great Heck Rail Crash) was a high-speed train crash that occurred at Great Heck near Selby, North Yorkshire, England, on the morning of 28February 2001. An InterCity 225 passenger train operated by Great North Eastern Railway (GNER) travelling from Newcastle to London collided with a Land Rover Defender which had crashed down a motorway embankment onto the railway line. Ten people were killed, including the drivers of both trains, and 82 were seriously injured. It remains the worst rail disaster of the 21st century in the United Kingdom.

Events
The crash occurred at approximately 06:13 (GMT), when a Land Rover Defender, driven by 37-year-old Gary Neil Hart and towing a loaded trailer (carrying a Renault Savanna estate car), left the carriageway of the westbound M62 motorway just before a bridge over the East Coast Main Line. The vehicle travelled  down an embankment and onto the southbound railway track. After failing to reverse off the track, Hart exited the vehicle and called the emergency services using a mobile telephone. During the call, the Land Rover was hit by a southbound Great North Eastern Railway (GNER) InterCity 225 heading from Newcastle to London King's Cross. The sound of the InterCity 225 colliding with the car was captured on Hart's 999 call; while the train sounded its horn upon the obstruction becoming visible, it was already too late for it to slow down.

The InterCity 225 was propelled by a Class 91 locomotive (No.91023) and led by Driving Van Trailer (DVT) No.82221. After striking the Land Rover, the leading bogie of the DVT derailed but the train stayed upright. Points to nearby sidings then deflected it into the path of an oncoming Freightliner freight train carrying coal and travelling from Immingham to Ferrybridge, hauled by a Class 66 locomotive (No.66521). 

The trailing locomotive was derailed, remained upright, and suffered minor damage. The Class 66 freight locomotive lost its bogies after impact, with debris from the DVT jammed underneath, rupturing its fuel tank. It overturned onto its left side coming to rest in the garden of a residence adjacent to the line to the north of the bridge. The locomotive sustained major damage to its cab area and right side. The first nine wagons following it were derailed and damaged to varying extents. Two wagons that left the line with the Class 66 locomotive flattened a caravan and garage on the grounds of the house all three came to rest in, but stopped short of striking the house itself.

Outcome
Both train drivers, two additional train crew on board the InterCity 225, and six passengers were killed, all as a result of the collision involving the freight train. Survivors of the crash included a train-driving instructor, Andrew Hill, who was travelling in the cab of 66521 and teaching a new route to the driver of the Class 66, a driver with 24years of experience.

The coaches of the InterCity 225 were carrying 99passengers and train staff. The early morning 04:45 departure time from Newcastle resulted in reduced passenger numbers. As it was, 45 of the 52 seriously injured passengers, and all eight fatalities (excluding the two locomotive drivers) were travelling in the first five coaches, which included a restaurant car and two first class coaches with less densely packed seating than standard coaches. In total 82 survivors were taken to hospital. The official incident report praised the crashworthiness of the InterCity 225's Mark4 coaches.

An unusual aspect of the emergency response was the need to carry out disinfecting procedures at the scene because of the 2001 United Kingdom foot-and-mouth outbreak.

Aftermath

Locomotive No.66526 has since been named "Driver Steve Dunn (George)", in memory of the Freightliner driver killed in the collision. It carries a plaque commemorating the disaster: "In remembrance of a dedicated engineman Driver Steve (George) Dunn was tragically killed in the accident at Great Heck on 28thFebruary 2001". Dunn's son James, who was nine at the time of the crash, later became a train driver. Barry Needham, another Freightliner employee killed in the crash, was also commemorated by the naming of 56115 after him. The nameplates and plaques were transferred to 60087 and later to 60091. The locomotives mentioned above also carried an explanatory plaque.

John Weddle, the GNER driver killed in the collision, was honoured by way of a new driver-training school in his home city of Newcastle, which was named after him. In a ceremony attended by members of his family, his 16-year-old daughter Stephanie unveiled a plaque dedicating the school to his memory.

Coincidentally, No.91023 was also involved in the Hatfield rail crash four months earlier. The locomotive escaped with only slight damage on both occasions. Technical upgrade of the Class91 fleet led to all locomotives having 100 added to their numbers (91001 became 91101, etc.), with the exception of 91023 being renumbered 91132, rather than 91123. Nicknamed 'Lucky' as a result of its history, 91132 remained in service until 2021, when it was scrapped by Sims Metals Scrapyard in Nottingham.

Legal proceedings
Hart, who escaped the incident unscathed, was later tried at Leeds Crown Court on ten counts of causing death by dangerous driving. He denied the charges, claiming that his car had suffered a mechanical fault or had collided with an object on the road. Although he had witnessed his Land Rover being struck by the intercity train, he claimed to have been unaware of the further collision involving the freight train until he was informed later by police.

An investigation, including reconstruction of the Land Rover to demonstrate that it was not mechanically defective, concluded that Hart had been driving in a sleep-deprived condition, and had not applied the brakes as his vehicle travelled down the embankment. It later transpired that Hart had stayed up the previous night talking on the telephone to a woman he had met through an internet dating agency.

Hart was found guilty on 13December 2001, and was sentenced to five years in prison and a five-year driving ban. He was released from prison in July 2004 after serving half of his sentence.

Campaigners drew attention to what they said was the inadequate length of the crash barriers alongside the motorway. According to the Health and Safety Executive's final report, the Land Rover had left the road 30yards before the barrier started and had easily broken through the simple wooden fence that lined the track. A 2003 Highways Agency review of crash barriers on bridges over railways concluded that only three bridges nationwide were in need of upgrading. The bridge at Great Heck was not one of them. By October 2003 Hart's insurers had paid out over £22 million. Gary Hart's insurers, through Hart's name, sued the Department for Transport for a contribution to the damages paid to GNER and the victims, alleging a degree of causation on the grounds that the safety barrier was inadequate (contributory negligence). The High Court judge ruled that the barrier length had been reasonable and there was no negligence.

See also
List of rail accidents in the United Kingdom
Nocton rail crash – in similar circumstances, a year to the day after the Selby rail crash
Ufton Nervet rail crash – a car parked on a level crossing by a suicidal man was struck by an InterCity 125, killing seven people
Polmont rail accident – a train propelled from the rear by a locomotive struck a cow on the railway
Oxshott rail crash – a concrete mixer lorry fell from a bridge onto a train
2005 Glendale train crash – also involving a car on the track and collisions with other trains

References

Sources

External links
Final report - Health and Safety Executive, posted on the website of the Office of Rail Regulation
Interim report
BBC News reports on the crash and its aftermath
 - From The Guardian
Highways Agency – crash report
ONE life: Asleep at the Wheel at True North Productions
Selby rail crash: 2001 disaster remembered

2001 crimes in the United Kingdom
2001 disasters in the United Kingdom
2001 in England
2000s in North Yorkshire
2000s trials
Accidents and incidents involving Great North Eastern Railway
Crime in Yorkshire
Derailments in England
East Coast Main Line
February 2001 crimes
February 2001 events in the United Kingdom
M62 motorway
Rail transport in North Yorkshire
Railway accidents and incidents in Yorkshire
Railway accidents in 2001
Rail crash
Train collisions in England
Transport disasters in Yorkshire
Trials in England